Novoselec is a village in central Croatia located southeast of Križ. The population is 1,362 (census 2011).

References

Populated places in Zagreb County